Thomas & Friends: Sodor's Legend of the Lost Treasure is a 2015 British computer-animated fantasy adventure comedy film and the ninth feature-length special of the British television series, Thomas & Friends. The film is produced by HIT Entertainment and animated by Arc Productions.

The film stars the voices of Joseph May and John Hasler as the voice of Thomas in the US and UK dubs respectively. It stars the voices of Olivia Colman, Keith Wickham, Tim Whitnall, Rob Rackstraw, William Hope, Kerry Shale, Christopher Ragland, Glenn Wrage, Joe Mills, Teresa Gallagher, Jules de Jongh, Steven Kynman and Tom Stourton in supporting roles.

Eddie Redmayne, Sir John Hurt, Jamie Campbell Bower and Nathan Clarke join the series’ voice cast, although only Bower and Clarke would continue to be involved in future projects. The film marks the screen debuts of Rex, Bert and Mike, the Arlesdale Railway engines, the central characters of the Reverend Wilbert Awdry's book, Small Railway Engines. The three characters, based on real locomotives from the Ravenglass and Eskdale Railway, had previously only appeared in The Railway Series and had been omitted from the TV show. Several characters who had been absent from the television series for many years also make their return.

.The film also features a cameo appearance from a fictionalized version of Wilbert Awdry, the author of the original books. The film received a theatrical release in the UK during July 2015 and in Australia during August, and was released on DVD on September 19. It was met with mostly positive reviews from critics, who praised the direction and solid plot but one critical of the film's somewhat dark undertone.

Plot
Thomas the Tank Engine takes an opportunity to beat Bertie the Bus in a race on his branch line When Bertie gets stuck behind an excavator on the road. Bertie complains about all of the machines working on the new branch line, which concerns Thomas' coaches Annie and Clarabel. The next morning, Thomas gets too cheeky and causes an accident at Knapford Junction. Sir Topham Hatt sends Thomas to the construction yard to work on the new branch line by force, while the new engine, Ryan, is given Thomas' job for the time being. 

At the building site, part of the land subsides underneath the new track. When Thomas arrives, he does not pay attention to the danger signs, falls into a cavern, and finds a pirate ship. While being lifted out, he tries to tell Sir Topham Hatt about the pirate ship, but he refuses to listen. The ship is found again by Rocky, and put onto display at Arlesburgh Harbour. After being repaired, Thomas meets Sailor John and his boat Skiff, which has been fitted with wheels that allow him to move on the rails. Sailor John explains that he is looking for treasure, but is hesitant to give Thomas any details. 

Shortly after Thomas saves Ryan from dynamites, Sir Topham Hatt furiously rages at Thomas for causing disasters at the construction yard, refuses to listen again and sends him back to his shed to have him stay there while ordering everybody else to get back to work. As Marion is digging into the side of a cliff in preparation for the rerouted track, she finds a treasure chest full of gold and jewelry. The Fat Controller decides to donate it to a museum. Thomas meets up with Sailor John on his way back to Knapford, who reveals that the treasure Marion had found is the same one he had been looking for, and angrily demands for it to be given to him. Thomas says that Sir Topham Hatt has the treasure, and refuses to help Sailor John take it.

That night, Sailor John breaks into Sir Topham Hatt’s office and steals the treasure chest, using Skiff as his reluctant getaway. Thomas chases them down the line and sees that Sailor John has rigged Skiff to the pirate ship on wheels, speeding down a hill. The chase goes through Arlesdale Junction where the miniature engines slow down the ship by knocking their ballast trucks over the rails. A loose rope attached to the ship gets stuck on Ryan, derailing it and leaving Sailor John with only Skiff to take him away.

At Arlesburgh Harbour, Thomas tries to knock Skiff off of the rails, but to no avail. They all end up at the rail-boat launch ramp where Sailor John rows skiff out towards the sea, and Thomas ends up partially submerged under water. With the help of a large wave, Skiff knocks Sailor John and the treasure off of him. The treasure sinks to the bottom of the harbour, and Sailor John is arrested by the police.

When the branch line is finished, Sir Topham Hatt gives Thomas his old job back, and lets him cut the ribbon to the new line; meanwhile, Skiff now gives railboat tours around Arlesburgh Harbour.

Voice cast

Reception

Box Office

Critical response
Sodor's Legend of the Lost Treasure currently holds an 80% "fresh" approval rating on Rotten Tomatoes, based on 5 reviews.

Andrew Pulver of The Guardian gave the film a 3/5 stating, "Like Tale of the Brave, Lost Treasure jams locomotive action together with a pop motif supposedly beloved of kids: Brave had dinosaurs, Treasure has pirates."

References

External links
 

2010s children's adventure films
2015 animated films
2015 films
Animated films about trains
Thomas & Friends
Universal Pictures direct-to-video animated films
2010s American animated films
Mattel Creations films
British children's adventure films
2015 computer-animated films
British computer-animated films
American computer-animated films
2010s children's animated films
2010s English-language films
2010s British films